The yellow-winged tanager (Thraupis abbas) is a neotropical member of the tanager family.  It is of average size for a tanager, about 18 centimetres (7 inches long).  It is distinguished by the yellow patches on its dusky green wings, marking an otherwise dark bluish and gray body.  It has a pale lavender tone on its throat and breast.  The juvenile lacks this color, but has an olive-green head and upper back.

Behavior and habitat

Like other members of the genus Thraupis, it is a species of open humid and mesic woodland.  It often forms flocks of 50 or more members.  It feeds on fruit, insects, and nectar.  The call is high and sibilant, and may be given in flight or while perched.

Nest and eggs
The nest of the yellow-winged tanager is a small cup-shaped nest of dried fibers, leaves, and mosses.  It is placed at mid-height on trees.  The female lays 3 eggs, which are gray, mottled with brown.

Range
The yellow-winged tanager is found on the Gulf of Mexico and Caribbean coasts from the states of Veracruz and the extreme south of San Luis Potosi in Mexico through the Yucatán Peninsula to Nicaragua, and on the Pacific coast from the Mexican state of Chiapas to Honduras.  It is generally relatively common throughout this range.
Since October 2010, it has been recorded in Los Chiles, northern Costa Rica.

References

Webb, Sophie and Howell, S.N.G.  Birds of Mexico and Northern Central America.  1995. 
Union de Ornitologos de Costa Rica - Updated CR List November 2011 - http://uniondeornitologos.com

External links

Yellow-winged Tanager videos on the Internet Bird Collection
Yellow-winged Tanager photo gallery VIREO Photo-High Res-(Close-up, showing yellow wing)

yellow-winged tanager
Birds of Central America
Birds of Mexico
Birds of the Yucatán Peninsula
Birds of Belize
Birds of Guatemala
Birds of El Salvador
Birds of Honduras
Birds of Nicaragua
yellow-winged tanager
Taxobox binomials not recognized by IUCN